This is a list of the genera of click beetles of India (excluding Lakshadweep):

Abelater Schimmel
Adelocera Latreille
Adiaphorus Candeze
Adrastus Eschscholtz
Aeolus
Aeoloderma Fleutiaux
Agonischius Candeze
Agriotes
Agrypnus Eschscholtz
Alaus 
Ampedus Germar
Anchastus LeConte
Aphanobius Eschscholtz
Athous
Campsosternus Latreille
Cardiophorus Eschscholtz
Cardiorhinus Eschscholtz
Chalcolepis Candeze
Conoderus Eschscholtz
Crepidomenus Erichson
Ctenicera Latreille
Denticollis
Dima
Drasterius
Elater Linnaeus
Glyphonyx Candeze
Glyphochilus Candeze
Hemicrepidius
Hemiops Castelnau
Heteroderes Latreille
Horistonotus Candeze
Hypnoidus Dillwyn
Lacon Castelnau
Lanelater Arnette
Megapenthes Kiesenwetter
Melanotus Eschscholtz
Melanoxanthus Eschscholtz
Meristhus Candeze
Monadicus Candeze
Negastrius Nakane & Kishii
Neoathousius
Octocryptus Candeze
Orientis Vats
Paracardiophorus Candeze
Pectocera Hope
Plectrosternus Lacordaire
Pleurathous
Procraerus Reitter
Rismethus Fleutiaux
Selatosomus
Senodonia Castelnau
Sericus
Sericosomus Stephens
Silesis Candeze
Tetrigus Candeze
Tetralobus Lepel. & Serv.
Xanthopenthes Schimmel
Zorochros

India, click beetle genera
Beetles of Asia
India